Nottjärn is a small lake in the city of Ludvika, Sweden. It is a popular place to swim in the summer.

Lakes of Dalarna County